For Eternal Hearts is a 2007 South Korean film.

Plot 
College professor Su-young recounts to his class the tale of his first love. As a student in the 1980s, he meets a wild and eccentric girl who he names "Pippi", and is crushed when she later jumps to her death from a window. But soon after she magically reappears, and his life becomes increasingly surreal and bizarre.

Cast 
 Jung Kyung-ho ... Su-young (student)
 Jung Jin-young ... Su-young (professor)
 Kim Min-sun ... Pippi
 Cha Soo-yeon ... Su-ji
 Kim C
 Jang Hang-sun
 Lee Soo-na
 Song Seung-hwan

Release 
For Eternal Hearts premiered as the opening film of the 11th Puchon International Fantastic Film Festival, held from July 12–21, 2007. From August 9, 2007 it was given a limited theatrical release in South Korea at independent theatre chain Spongehouse, where it received a total of 6,724 admissions nationwide and grossed (as of September 16, 2007) . The film was later invited to the "Winds of Asia" category of the Tokyo International Film Festival, which opened on October 20, 2007.

References

External links 
  
 
 
 

2007 films
2000s romantic fantasy films
South Korean independent films
2007 independent films
Sponge Entertainment films
2000s Korean-language films
South Korean romantic fantasy films
2000s South Korean films